The 166th Air Refueling Squadron (166 ARS) is a unit of the Ohio Air National Guard 121st Air Refueling Wing located at Rickenbacker Air National Guard Base, Columbus, Ohio. The 166th is equipped with the KC-135R Stratotanker.

History

World War II
The 364th Fighter Squadron was established at Hamilton Field, California in December 1942 and was part of the 357th Fighter Group.

Became part of the United States Air Forces in Europe army of occupation in Germany during 1945. Inactivated in Germany during August 1946.

Ohio Air National Guard

The wartime 364th Fighter Squadron was re-designated as the 166th Fighter Squadron, and was allotted to the Ohio Air National Guard, on 24 May 1946. It was organized at Lockbourne Army Airfield, Columbus, Ohio, and was extended federal recognition on 10 November 1947 by the National Guard Bureau. The 166th Fighter Squadron was bestowed the lineage, history, honors, and colors of the 364th Fighter Squadron. The squadron was equipped with F-51D Mustangs and was assigned initially to the Illinois ANG 66th Fighter Wing, operationally gained by Continental Air Command.   On 7 December 1947 the Ohio ANG 55th Fighter Wing, was federally recognized and the squadron was transferred.

With the formation and federal recognition of the Ohio ANG 121st Fighter Group at Lockbourne Field, near Columbus, the squadron was reassigned.   The mission of the 166th Fighter Squadron was the air defense of Ohio.  Parts were no problem and many of the maintenance personnel were World War II veterans so readiness was quite high and the planes were often much better maintained than their USAF counterparts. In some ways, the postwar Air National Guard was almost like a flying country club and a pilot could often show up at the field, check out an aircraft and go flying. However, the unit also had regular military exercises that kept up proficiency and in gunnery and bombing contests they would often score at least as well or better than active-duty USAF units, given the fact that most ANG pilots were World War II combat veterans.

In October 1948 the squadron exchanged its F-51Ds for F-51H Mustang very long range escort fighters that were suitable for long-range interception of unknown aircraft identified by Ground Control Interceptor radar stations, the 166th being one of the first ANG squadrons to receive the F-51H.  In March 1950, the squadron entered the jet age with the receipt of Republic F-84C Thunderjets.

Korean War federalization
With the surprise invasion of South Korea on 25 June 1950, and the regular military's complete lack of readiness, most of the Air National Guard was called to active duty. The 166th Fighter Squadron was federalized on 10 February 1951 and assigned to the 122d Fighter-Interceptor Group of the Indiana Air National Guard of Air Defense Command as the 166th Fighter-Interceptor Squadron.  The squadron initially remained at Lockbourne and flew air defense training missions.

On 20 September, the 166th was reassigned to the Federalized Oregon ANG 142d Fighter-Interceptor Group which was headquartered at O'Hare International Airport with no change of mission.  However, ADC was experiencing difficulty under the existing wing base organizational structure in deploying its fighter squadrons to best advantage. Therefore, in February 1952 the squadron was reassigned to the 4706th Defense Wing, which was organized on a geographic basis.

However, Strategic Air Command (SAC) had taken over Lockbourne AFB on 1 April 1951 and it was decided to move the 166th to Youngstown Municipal Airport, Ohio, which was accomplished in August 1952.  The move resulted in a reassignment to the 4708th Air Defense Wing.  The squadron was released from Federal Service and returned to Ohio state control on 1 November and its mission, personnel and F-84 aircraft at Youngstown were taken over by the 86th Fighter-Interceptor Squadron.

Air defense command
After the Korean War mobilization ended, the ADC 86th Fighter-Interceptor Squadron assumed the assets of the 166th Fighter-Interceptor Squadron F-84Cs and many of their personnel.

The 166th was re-equipped with F-51H Mustangs which the squadron flew until 1954 when the 166th received refurbished F-80A Shooting Stars that had been modified and upgraded to F-80C standards.  With the F-80s, the squadron began standing daytime air defense alert at Youngstown, placing two aircraft at the end of the runway with pilots in the cockpit from one hour before sunrise until one hour after sunset. The squadron only operated the Shooting Star until January 1955 when the 166th received F-84E Thunderjets that had returned from wartime duty in Korea.

Upgraded with new F-84F Thunderstreaks in November 1957, the gaining command of the squadron became Tactical Air Command (TAC), however, it remained attached to Air Defense Command in a secondary role.  In 1959, the need for active duty Air Defense Command bases and regular Air Force fighter-interceptor operations were diminishing and the intent to scale back operations at Youngstown AFB was announced on 28 October 1959.  The Ohio Air National Guard moved the 121st FBG back to Lockbourne Air Force Base on 1 March 1960.

1961 Berlin Crisis

The 121st Tactical Fighter Wing were called to active duty for a period of twelve months on 1 October.  When activated, the wing consisted of three operational units, the Ohio ANG 162d Tactical Fighter Squadron, based at Springfield Municipal Airporto; the Ohio ANG 164th Tactical Fighter Squadron, based at Mansfield-Lahm Municipal Airport, and the 166th TFS.

The mission of the activated 121st TFW was to reinforce the United States Air Forces in Europe (USAFE), and deploy to Étain-Rouvres Air Base, France, a standby USAFE base.  However, due to funding shortages, only 26 F-84F Thunderstreaks of 166th TFS was deployed to France, although several ground support units from the 162nd and 164th were also deployed.

On 4 November the first ANG T-33 aircraft arrived at Etain, with the F-84's arriving on 16 November.  On 11 December, the deployed units of the 121st TFW were redesignated the 7121st Tactical Wing.    Ground shipments of equipment and supplies arrived from Ohio during January 1962 along with additional supplies and equipment from the Chateauroux-Deols Air Depot.

The mission of the 7121st TW was tactical air support of US Army units in case of an armed conflict with the Warsaw Pact, and alert began almost immediately upon arrival.  Four F-84F's were loaded with armament and maintained on alert 24/7 for continual launch preparedness.   However, as the F-84 was a day fighter only, its night alert was of limited use if necessary.

Rotational deployments to the gunnery range at Wheelus AB were also made, where the excellent weather and ranges there provided the Air National Guard pilots an opportunity to re-qualify in air-to-air and air-to-ground weapons delivery.   Weather permitting, daily missions at U S Army training ranges in West Germany were also flown to exercise with ground units there.  Several ANG fighter pilots were detached as Forward Air Controllers and Air Liaison Officers to work with Seventh Army units, and additional pilots were deployed from Ohio to keep the squadron at full strength.

A NATO exchange program was conducted with the West German Air Force, with 4 F-84's being deployed to Hopsten Air Base, West Germany with an equal number of German personnel and aircraft being deployed to Etain to fly missions with the 166th.   This was the first German Air Force deployment to France since the end of World War II.

In July 1962 the deployed Air National Guardsmen were no longer needed in Europe and the 7121st began to redeploy its personnel to Ohio.  All the aircraft and support equipment, however, remained at Etain to equip a new wing being formed there, the 366th Tactical Fighter Wing.

The last of the ANG personnel departed on 9 August 1962.

Tactical air command

Having left their Thunderstreaks in France, the 166th TFW was re-equipped with F-100C Super Sabre fighter-bombers, which greatly enhanced its mission capabilities.   During the mid-1960s the squadron trained with the supersonic jet, however on 26 January 1968, in response to the USS Pueblo incident, President Johnson mobilized a major portion of the Selected Reserve Force, which included the 166th TFS.

Along with the Kansas ANG F-100C 127th Tactical Fighter Squadron, the 166th was federalized and deployed to Kunsan Air Base, South Korea. The federalized ANG squadrons were assigned as part of the 354th Tactical Fighter Wing.  The squadrons flew deterrent air defense missions over South Korean airspace during the next year.  During the deployment some pilots flew combat missions in South Vietnam while performing temporary assignments with other units.  The performance of the ANG units at Kusan in 1968–69 suggested the prerequisites of effective air reserve programs and paved the way for adoption of the total force policy in 1970 which exists today.

On 10 June 1968, the ANG squadrons returned to the United States after the men of the Pueblo were released.  However, the experience of the F-100's in South Korea showed the Air Force that the F-100C was not a good air defense aircraft. The F-100s were aging and clearly unsuited to the most pressing operational responsibilities in the event of an attack by the North Koreans. In addition, the F-100's were slow in attaining altitude and lacked an effective all-weather, air-to-air combat capability, essential in Korea.    In 1971 the F-100Cs were retired and replaced by F-100D/F Super Sabres, being received from combat units in South Vietnam that were returning to the United States.

In 1974 Lockbourne AFB was renamed Rickenbacker AFB in honor of Captain Eddie Rickenbacker, the World War I "Ace of Aces" and a Columbus, Ohio native.  Also in 1974, under the "Total Force Policy", Guard and Reserve units began to receive newer aircraft and equipment in the 1970s.  The 121st began conversion to the A-7D Corsair II in December which brought with it additional missions.    Beginning in 1977, the 166th began a NATO commitment to the United States Air Forces in Europe (USAFE), and began deployments to West German and English bases exercising with NATO and USAFE units in a series of exercises.   The first deployment, in May 1977 to Ingolstadt Manching Air Base, West Germany the 166th deployed 10 A-7Ds as part of "Coronet Whist". In Germany, the units A-7Ds exercised with A-7s from the PA ANG 146th TFS (Pittsburgh IAP) and West German aircraft. In July 1978, a deployment to RAF Wittering, England saw 3 A-7Ds as part of "Coronet Teal".

When the active duty units departed in 1979, Rickenbacker became an Air National Guard Base with the 121st as its largest flying unit.  The 1980s brought new and more demanding tasks when the 121st became part of President Jimmy Carter's Rapid Deployment Joint Task Force (RDJTF) and was ultimately integrated into war plans as a part of United States Central Command Air Forces (CENTAF) in the 1980s.

Training for this high priority mission was intense and included many deployments, exercises and evaluations.  Additional deployments during the 1980s were Coronet Castle and Coronet Miami at RAF Sculthorpe, England, and "Creek Corsair".  Cornet Fox, at Leck Air Base, West Germany in May 1986, saw the squadron stage though Lajes Air Base, Azores and RAF Mildenhall, England before arriving in West Germany A deployment in July and August 1988, to Spangdahlem Air Base, West Germany, being the last NATO deployment for the squadron with the Corsairs.

By the time of Operation Desert Shield/Desert Storm in 1990, the A-7D Corsairs were not considered front-line aircraft and the squadron was not activated.  However the 121st TFW provided support for operations at home station while smaller elements and individuals served as active duty augmenters in several locations. The 121st Security Forces Squadron was activated and deployed to the Persian Gulf in November 1990. Stationed at Sheik Isa Air Base, Bahrain, it served under combat conditions, returning home in April 1991.

Air refueling

With the end of the Cold War, a major reorganization of the Air Force was soon underway which would bring about the most significant mission change in the history of the 121st. After 35 years of flying fighters it was to become an air refueling wing.

In 1992, the A-7D’s were flown to storage at Davis-Monthan AFB, Arizona and the first KC-135R Stratotankers were received. The 121st also assumed base support responsibilities. In October 1993, the 121st Air Refueling Wing was consolidated with the 160th Air Refueling Group which was inactivated in the process. With this consolidation, the 121st became a "Super Wing" by gaining the 145th Air Refueling Squadron.

Under the 120th ARW, the squadron began flying from bases in southern France to support strike aircraft during Operation Deny Flight missions over the Balkans. The unit was a fixture at Incirlik Air Base, Turkey, as well as Prince Sultan Air Base, Saudi Arabia, supporting Operations Northern Watch and Operation Southern Watch, respectively, over Iraq.

After the terrorist attacks on 11 September 2001, the 121st Air Refueling Wing launched into immediate action supporting armed aircraft over the United States during Operation Noble Eagle. The 121st ARW had the distinction of flying more missions than any other unit during this time. The 121st ARW has also deployed and participated in Operation Enduring Freedom over Afghanistan, as well as Operation Iraqi Freedom over Iraq.

In addition to the combat deployments, the unit has also been very heavily tasked with airlift missions during national emergencies. Immediately following Hurricane Katrina in August 2005, the 121ARW was one of the first units to send aircraft into Louisiana filled with supplies and troops. Similar missions were flown in September 2005, after Hurricane Rita.

Lineage

 Constituted 364th Fighter Squadron and activated, on 1 December 1942
 Inactivated on 20 August 1946.
 Re-designated: 166th Fighter Squadron, and allotted to Ohio ANG, on 21 August 1946
 Extended federal recognition on 10 November 1947
 Re-designated: 166th Fighter Squadron (Jet), 1 March 1950
 Federalized and ordered to active service on: 10 February 1951
 Re-designated: 166th Fighter-Interceptor Squadron, 10 February 1951
 Released from active duty and returned to Ohio state control, 1 November 1952
 Re-designated: 166th Fighter-Bomber Squadron, 1 November 1957
 Re-designated: 166th Tactical Fighter Squadron, 1 September 1961
 Federalized and ordered to active service on: 1 October 1961
 Released from active duty and returned to Ohio state control, 20 August 1962
 Federalized and ordered to active service on: 26 January 1968
 Released from active duty and returned to Ohio state control, 18 June 1969
 Re-designated: 166th Air Refueling Squadron, 16 January 1993
 Components designated as: 166th Expeditionary Air Refueling Squadron when deployed as part of an Air and Space Expeditionary unit after June 1996.

Assignments
 357th Fighter Group, 1 Dec 1942 – 20 Aug 1946
 66th Fighter Wing, 10 November 1947
 55th Fighter Wing, 7 December 1947
 121st Fighter Group, 26 June 1948
 122d Fighter-Interceptor Group, 10 February 1951
 142d Fighter-Interceptor Group, 20 September 1951
 121st Fighter-Interceptor Group, 1 November 1952
 121st Fighter-Bomber Group, 1 November 1957
 121st Tactical Fighter Group, 1 September 1961
 Attached to: 7121st Tactical Wing, 4 November 1961 – 9 August 1962
 354th Tactical Fighter Wing, 26 January 1968
 121st Tactical Fighter Group, 18 June 1969
 121st Tactical Fighter Wing, 1 July 1974
 121st Air Refueling Wing, 16 January 1993
 121st Operations Group, 1 October 1993 – Present

Stations

 Hamilton Field, California, 1 December 1942
 Tonopah Army Airfield, Nevada, 6 March 1943
 Santa Rosa Army Airfield, California, 3 June 1943
 Oroville Army Airfield, California, 18 August 1943
 Casper Army Airfield, Wyoming, 7 Oct-9 Nov 1943
 RAF Raydon (AAF-157), England, 1 December 1943
 RAF Leiston (AAF-373), England, 1 February 1944
 AAF Station Neubiberg, Germany, 20 Jul 1945 – 20 Aug 1946
 Lockbourne Army Airfield, Ohio, 10 November 1947
 Re-designated: Lockbourne Air Force Base, Ohio, 13 January 1948

 Youngstown Municipal Airport, Ohio, 31 October 1952
 Lockbourne Air Force Base, Ohio, 1 March 1960
 Operated from: Étain-Rouvres Air Base, France, 4 November 1961 – 9 August 1962
 Operated from: Kunsan Air Base, South Korea, 2 July 1968 – 14 June 1970
 Re-designated: Rickenbacker Air Force Base, 18 May 1974
 Re-designated: Rickenbacker Air National Guard Base, 1 April 1980–Present

Aircraft

 P-39 Airacobra, 1943
 P-51B/C/D/K Mustang, 1943–1946
 F-51D Mustang, 1947–1948
 F-51H Mustang, 1948–1950; 1952–1954
 F-84C Thunderjet, 1950–1952
 F-80C Shooting Star, 1954–1955

 F-84E Thunderjet, 1955–1958
 F-84F Thunderjet, 1957–1962
 F-100C Super Sabre, 1962–1971
 F-100D/F Super Sabre, 1971–1974
 A-7D/K Corsair II, 1974–1993
 KC-135R Stratotanker, 1993–Present

Aircraft flying in this unit
KC-135
63-7992(R) (Jan'94); 63-7993(R) (Jan'94)

References

Notes

Bibliography

 
 Grant, C.L., The Development of Continental Air Defense to 1 September 1954, (1961), USAF Historical Study No. 126, p. 33
 

Further reading
 McLaren, David (2004) Lockheed P-80/F-80 Shooting Star: A Photo Chronicle, Schiffer Publishing, Ltd., 
 McLaren, David. (1998) Republic F-84 Thunderjet, Thunderstreak & Thunderflash: A Photo Chronicle, Atglen, PA: Schiffer Military/Aviation History. .
 Rogers, B. (2006) United States Air Force Unit Designations Since 1978 
 Stroup, Robert M. II, (2008) Crossroads of Liberty, Pictorial Histories Publishing Co, Inc. .
 Anonymous (1988) Ohio Air National Guard 60 Year History, Columbus, OH, Headquarters Ohio Air National Guard;

External links

Squadrons of the United States Air National Guard
Air refueling squadrons of the United States Air Force
Military units and formations in Ohio